SC Pick Szeged is a Hungarian handball club, based in Szeged, Hungary.

European record
As of 1 March 2020:

EHF-organised seasonal competitions
Szeged score listed first. As of 1 March 2020''.

Champions League

EHF Cup

City Cup (Challenge Cup)

Cup Winners' Cup
From the 2012–13 season, the men's competition was merged with the EHF Cup.

References

External links
 Official website 
 MOL-Pick Szeged at eurohandball.com

Hungarian handball clubs in European handball